Fabien Doubey (born 21 October 1993) is a French cyclist, who currently rides for UCI ProTeam . His brother, Loïc Doubey is also a cyclist.

Major results

Cyclo-cross
2010–2011
1st  National Junior Championships
2nd UCI World Junior Championships
2013–2014
3rd National Under-23 Championships
2014–2015
1st  National Under-23 Championships
 Coupe de France Under-23
1st Round 1, Besançon 
1st Round 2, Sisteron
5th Overall UCI Under-23 World Cup

Road
2014
 1st Franche-Comté Road Race Championships
2015
 1st Stage 4 Tour Nivernais Morvan
2016
 1st Stage 4 Tour du Jura
2019
 4th Trofeo Matteotti
 6th Tokyo 2020 Test Event
 8th Overall Tour of Oman

Grand Tour general classification results timeline

References

External links

1993 births
Living people
French male cyclists
Sportspeople from Ain
Cyclo-cross cyclists
Cyclists from Auvergne-Rhône-Alpes